Robert John Beaven (born 12 March 1941 – 11 February 2019) was an Australian rules footballer who played with Richmond in the Victorian Football League (VFL).

Notes

External links 
		

Boyles Football Photos

2019 deaths
1941 births
Australian rules footballers from Victoria (Australia)
Richmond Football Club players